Psathi may refer to the following places:

Cyprus 
 Psathi, Paphos

Greece 
 Psathi, Arcadia, a village in Arcadia
 Psathi, Ios, a village on the island of Ios, Cyclades 
 Psathi, Kimolos, the port of the island Kimolos, Cyclades